Kadoelen is a neighborhood of Amsterdam, Netherlands located in the Noord borough.

Amsterdam-Noord
Neighbourhoods of Amsterdam